The following table shows the world record progression in the women's 100 metres hurdles. The first world record in the event was recognised by the International Association of Athletics Federations in 1969.
22 world records have been ratified by the IAAF in the event.

Records 1969–76

Records since 1977
From 1975, the IAAF accepted separate automatically electronically timed records for events up to 400 metres. From 1977, the IAAF required fully automatic timing to the hundredth of a second for these events.

References

100 h, women
World record